The 2013–14 Ram Slam T20 Challenge was the eleventh season of the Ram Slam T20 Challenge, established by the Cricket South Africa. The tournament was previously known as the MiWay T20 Challenge and the Standard Bank Pro20 Series. The tournament was played between 5 January and 9 February 2014.

The Dolphins beat the Cape Cobras in the final by 2 runs to win the tournament for the first time.

Venues

The first round of matches were all played on 5 January in Cape Town.

Rules and regulations
The tournament is divided into a group stage and a knockout stage. In the group stage, teams face each other in a double round-robin tournament (i.e. each team plays every other team twice, once at home and once away). At the end of the group stage, the top team qualifies for the final. The teams in second and third take part in a play-off match with the winners contesting the final. If a match in the knockout stage ends with a tie, a Super Over will determine the winner.

Points were awarded as follows in the group stage:

 The team that achieves a run rate of 1.25 times that of the opposition shall be rewarded one bonus point.
 A team's run rate will be calculated by reference to the runs scored in an innings divided by the number of overs faced.
 Points are deducted for slow over rate at 1 point per over not completed within the allotted 90 minutes.

In the event of teams finishing on equal points, the right to play in the semi-finals will be determined in the following order of priority:

 The team with the most wins;
 If still equal, the team with the most wins over the other team(s) who are equal on points and have the same number of wins;
 If still equal, the team with the highest number of bonus points;
 If still equal, the team with the highest net run rate;
 The team with the higher runs to wickets ratio throughout the series.

Teams and standings

 List of results at ESPN Cricinfo

Knockout stage
Semi-final

Final

References

External links
 Tournament page on ESPN Cricinfo

South African domestic cricket competitions
Ram Slam T20 Challenge
2013–14 South African cricket season